XHDR-FM 99.5 is a radio station in Guaymas, Sonora. It carries a pop format known as Digital 99 1/2 and is owned locally by Grupo Radio Guaymas.

History
XEDR received its first concession in 1938. It was owned by Modesto Ortega and broadcast on 1490 kHz. By the 1960s, Ortega had died, and his successors owned the station.

The station added an FM combo in 1994, XHDR-FM 99.5. In the mid-2000s, it also moved from 1490 to 830, changing from a 1 kW day/0.25 kW night station to offer 2.5 kilowatts of power during the day.

In 2012, the station was sold after decades of being owned by Ortega's successors, to Radio Amistad de Sonora, owned by the Lizárraga Verdugo family. In a letter dated December 11, 2017, Radio Amistad de Sonora told the Federal Telecommunications Institute of its decision not to renew the AM station, leaving XHDR as an FM-only operation.

References

Radio stations in Sonora
Radio stations established in 1938